Kasseedorf is a municipality in the district of Ostholstein, in Schleswig-Holstein, Germany. West of the village is the lake of the Stendorfer See.

References

Ostholstein